Phillup Alan "Sonny" Partin (born June 29, 1965, in Sacramento, California) is an American convicted murderer currently on Florida death row at Union Correctional Institution. Partin was sentenced to death by a 9–3 vote in favor of the sentence by a jury on December 1, 2008, for the July 31, 2002 murder of 16-year-old hitchhiker Joshan Ashbrook.

Murder
Evidence at Partin's trial showed that he picked up Ashbrook as he hitchhiked along U.S. Highway 19 in Florida on July 31, 2002. He and Ashbrook spent the day fishing and swimming with Partin's daughter, then 6, before returning to the New Port Richey house where he and his daughter were living. Prosecutors think Ashbrook was killed between 9 p.m. and midnight. The next morning, workers found her body in woods off Shady Hills Road. She had been strangled, her throat gashed and her neck broken. Nine days after the discovery, Partin dropped his daughter off at the home of a foster mother, Jean Prestridge, later known as Jean Edenfield, in Wauchula and left the state. His daughter Patrisha's two sisters lived with this foster mother in her Wauchula home. Jean kept Patrisha for five days but then gave her up to foster care. He was a fugitive for more than a year before investigators tracked him to Fayetteville, North Carolina. He was arrested there on October 28, 2003.

Background
Partin was a prostitute with male clients. Partin was convicted of second-degree murder in Florida after he killed one of his clients, Gary Thorne, a math teacher from Key Biscayne. Thorne was strangled with a telephone cord in his home. He was convicted of second-degree murder, armed robbery and armed burglary in 1989 and sentenced to 17 years in prison. Partin was released from prison on August 1, 1995. He then worked in construction and had a daughter, Patrisha Windham (born c. 1996), with Martha Windham. He had sole custody of his daughter prior to Ashbrook's death.

See also
List of death row inmates in the United States

References

1965 births
2002 murders in the United States
Living people
American robbers
American prisoners sentenced to death
American people convicted of murder
People convicted of murder by Florida
People from Sacramento, California
Prisoners sentenced to death by Florida